Nicola Minali (born 10 November 1969 in Isola della Scala, Veneto) is an Italian former road bicycle racer. He won a total of twelve stages in Grand Tours, including the prestigious Champs-Élysées stage in 1997 Tour de France. He also won the Paris–Tours classic twice.

His name was on the list of doping tests published by the French Senate on 24 July 2013 that were collected during the 1998 Tour de France and found positive for EPO when retested in 2004.

He is the father of racing cyclist Riccardo Minali.

Major results

1993
 1st Stage 2 Three Days of De Panne
1994
 1st Stage 5 Tour de France
Tour de Romandie
1st Stages 2 & 5 
 1st Stage 2 Setmana Catalana de Ciclisme
1995
 1st Paris–Tours
 Vuelta a España
1st Stages 1, 6 & 11 
 1st Stage 6 Giro d'Italia
 Setmana Catalana de Ciclisme
1st Stages 2, 4 & 5
 Tirreno–Adriatico
1st Stages 3 & 6 
 Danmark Rundt
1st Stages 1, 4 & 6
 1st Stage 3 Volta a la Comunitat Valenciana
 1st Stage 1 Vuelta a Aragón
1996
 1st Paris–Tours
 Vuelta a España
1st Stages 2, 8, 9 & 16
 Vuelta a Burgos
1st Stages 1 & 5
 1st Stage 5 Danmark Rundt
1997
 Tour de France
1st Stages 4 & 21
 Gran Premio Jornal de Noticias
1st Stages 1 & 2
 Volta ao Alentejo
1st Stages 1 & 4
 1st Stage 1 Danmark Rundt
 1st Stage 3 Giro di Puglia
 1st Stage 1 Giro di Sardegna
1998
 1st Giro dell'Etna
 1st Stage 3 Giro d'Italia
 1st Stage 3a Rheinland-Pfalz Rundfahrt
 1st Stage 5a Setmana Catalana de Ciclisme
 1st Stage 5 Tour Méditerranéen
1999
 1st Stage 1 Four Days of Dunkirk
 1st Stage 5 Settimana Lombarda
2001
 Tour of Rhodes
1st Stages 1 & 2 
 1st Stage 5 Postgirot Open

References

External links

1969 births
Living people
Cyclists from the Province of Verona
Italian male cyclists
Italian Tour de France stage winners
Italian Giro d'Italia stage winners
Italian Vuelta a España stage winners
Tour de France Champs Elysées stage winners